Christopher Michael Kise (born ) is an American lawyer who served as the second Solicitor General of Florida from 2003 to 2006.

Kise has served on the board of directors of Enterprise Florida, was an advisor to Republican politicians Charlie Crist and Ron DeSantis, and joined Donald Trump's legal team in 2022. Other notable clients include Rick Scott and Andrew Gillum.

Early life and education 
Kise was born in 1964 or 1965. He graduated from Florida State University College of Law in 1990 after obtaining a degree in accounting from the University of Miami in 1986. While studying, he also worked as the managing editor and the articles editor of the Florida Law Review.

Career 
Kise unsuccessfully ran for Senate as a Republican in the 1998 United States Senate elections.

In 2002, friend Charlie Crist chose Kise to be second Solicitor General of Florida, his term starting in 2003 and ending in 2006. Later, Kise worked as a legal advisor Crist. He was won four US Supreme Court cases. In 2008, he was criticised by Public Service Commissioner Nancy Argenziano for working as the government's special adviser on energy and climate change while also representing companies responsible for pollution. Until 2016, Kise was on the board of directors of Enterprise Florida. In 2019, Kise was a transition advisor for Ron DeSantis. Other clients have included Rick Scott, Charlie Crist, and Andrew Gillum. 

On August 30, 2022 Kise joined the team of lawyers supporting Donald Trump during the FBI investigation into his handling of government documents. The same day, Kise left Tallahassee law firm Foley & Lardner and joined Miami law firm Continental PLLC to do that work. Kise's fee for the work was US$3 million, and was paid from Trump's Save America PAC. A month later, Trump shifted Kise's responsibilities towards other legal work, including legal issues arising from Trump's role in the January 6 United States Capitol attack.

See also 

 Legal affairs of Donald Trump
 List of lawsuits involving Donald Trump
 Post-election lawsuits related to the 2020 U.S. presidential election

References

External links 

 Official website

Year of birth missing (living people)
Living people
Florida lawyers
Florida State University alumni
University of Miami alumni
Donald Trump litigation
Solicitors General of Florida
1960s births